Kim is a census town in Surat district in the Indian state of Gujarat.

Demographics
 India census, Kim had a population of 18,638. Males constitute 53.49% of the population and females 46.51%. Kim has an average literacy rate of 89.25%: male literacy is 92.74%, and female literacy is 85.22%. In Kim, 12.38% of the population is under 6 years of age.

Transport

Railway
Kim railway station is located on the Western Railway Mumbai – Vadodara Segment. It is 24 km from Surat, 105 km from Vadodara.

References

Suburban area of Surat
Cities and towns in Surat district